Stanisław Trela (1892–1950) was a Polish architect best known for his designs of public utility buildings in interwar Ivano-Frankivsk (then Stanisławów, Second Polish Republic).

Trela was born on 19 April 1892  in Żurawiczki, Austria-Hungary. His father was a teacher. He finished his school education in Przemyśl and in 1913 started to study architecture at Lemberg Polytechnic. In 1918–1919, he served in the Polish Army. He was promoted to the rank of lieutenant. Trela received his degree in architecture in 1924, and a year later moved to Stanisławów where he worked as the city architect from 1928 to 1932. He also presided over the local Society of Independent Construction Managers and was a member of the Polish Polytechnical Society. 

Trela was a student of noted architect . His architectural style combined modern and traditional elements. He often incorporated a simplified monumental classicism to his projects.

Projects
His major works in Ivano-Frankivsk (Stanisławów) included: 
 Town Hall 
 Roman Catholic Church in Górka district
 Stanisław Moniuszko Municipal Theater at Mickiewicz square (now Ivano-Frankivsk Concert Hall, Les Kurbas street) 
 Expansion and reconstruction of "Sokół" Gymnastic Society building (originally designed by Karol Zaremba in 1894–1905)
 The "Ton" cinema 
 School complex in Matejki street (now the city's hospital)
 Craftsmen's hall of residence in Sobieski street
 Fire brigade building
 Restoration of Armenian Church

References

20th-century Polish architects
People from Przeworsk County
Polish Austro-Hungarians
Lviv Polytechnic alumni
People from Ivano-Frankivsk
uk:Станіслав Треля